Cano Sport Academy, simply known as Cano Sport, is an Equatoguinean football club based in the city of Malabo. It was founded in early 2014 by Cándido Nsue. They are the current champions of the Liga Nacional de Fútbol.

Achievements
Equatoguinean Premier League: 1
2019.

Equatoguinean Cup: 0

Equatoguinean SuperCup: 0

Players

Current squad

Notable players

References

 
Association football clubs established in 2014
2014 establishments in Equatorial Guinea
Sport in Malabo